is a multi-purpose venue located on the second floor of the Matsushita IMP Building, in Osaka, Japan. It has a floor area of 642.96m2 and 857 movable seats. It has hosted many notable international touring artists, such as Morrissey, Night Ranger, Alice Cooper, My Chemical Romance, Linkin Park, Cheap Trick, Kansas, Iron Maiden, UFO, Green Day, Rage Against the Machine and Björk.

References

External links
 Official website

Arts centres in Japan
Concert halls in Japan
Music in Osaka
Tourist attractions in Osaka
Buildings and structures in Osaka